Fordite, also known as Detroit agate or Motor City agate, is old automotive paint which has hardened sufficiently to be cut and polished. It was formed from the buildup of layers of enamel paint slag on tracks and skids on which cars were hand spray-painted (a now automated process), which have been baked numerous times. In recent times the material has been recycled into jewelry.

References

Further reading
 Tao Hsu and Andrew Lucas, 'Fordite from the Corvette Assembly Plant', Gems & Gemology, 52.1 (Spring 2016)

External links

Jewellery components
Culture of Detroit
Paint recycling